Lacquy is a commune in the Landes department in Nouvelle-Aquitaine in south-western France.

Lacquy may also refer to a brand of armagnac.

See also
Communes of the Landes department
Château de Lacquy, Armagnac producer and distributors list

References

Communes of Landes (department)